Two ships of the Royal Navy have been named HMS Chamois after the mountain goat of the same name:

 was a Palmer three funnel, 30 knot destroyer launched in 1896 and lost in the Gulf of Patras in 1904 when she foundered after her own broken propeller blade pierced her hull.
 was a Lend-Lease  launched in 1942 and damaged by a mine in 1944. She was returned to the US Navy in 1946 and broken up in 1950.

References

Royal Navy ship names